Agthori railway station is a small railway station in Guwahati, Assam. Its code is AGT. It serves Guwahati City. The station consists of 2 platforms and is located next to the Indian Institute of Technology Guwahati.

The station is located on the New Bongaigaon–Guwahati section of the Barauni–Guwahati line. It is located at a distance of 13.9 km from the Guwahati railway station.

It is also connected to the Amingaon Container Depot of Container Corporation of India via a line of approximately 686 m in length.

The station is currently not served by any long-distance trains and is served by only passenger trains, which are as follows:-

 55801/55802 Manas Rhino Passenger
 55753/55754 Shifung Passenger
 55801/55810 Guwahati–New Bongaigaon Passenger

The station serves the areas of North Guwahati, Amingaon and Hajo.

References

External links

Transport in Guwahati
Railway stations in Guwahati
Lumding railway division